Delano is a city in Kern County, California, United States. The population was 51,428 in 2020, down from 53,041 in 2010. It is Kern County's second-largest city after Bakersfield.

Agriculture is Delano's major industry. The area is particularly well known as a center for the growing of table grapes. Delano is also home to two California state prisons, North Kern State Prison and Kern Valley State Prison. The Voice of America ceased broadcasts in October 2007, citing a changing political mission, reduced budgets, and changes in technology.

Delano's two school districts currently operate eight elementary schools, three middle schools, three comprehensive high schools and two alternative high schools. The city has its own police department and contracts with the Kern County Fire Department for fire services, EMS services are privately provided by local company, Delano Ambulance Service.

History
Delano was founded on July 14, 1869, as a railroad town, not because the railroad passed through the town but because the railroad coming south from San Francisco terminated at Delano. The name was officially given by the Southern Pacific Railroad in honor of Columbus Delano, at the time the Secretary of the Interior (1870-1875) for the United States. The first post office opened in 1874. Delano incorporated in 1913.

The town started with a boom. With Delano as the southern terminus of the railroad, it became the headquarters for hundreds of workmen who were building the railroad into town, and who eventually built the railroad into Bakersfield the following year. Meanwhile, the merchandise that formerly was trucked south from Visalia to Bakersfield and then to Walker Pass, or perhaps Tejon Pass, en route to Los Angeles, now coming via freight from the south, east and west, was likewise trucked in by ox or mule team. Great loads of bullion were delivered here from the mines in the mountains. Delano became the northern terminus for the passenger stages that ran south to Bakersfield and Los Angeles. The fare from Bakersfield to Delano was $7.00.

Delano was a major hub of farm worker organization efforts and Chicano political movements. Filipino immigrants Philip Vera Cruz and Larry Dulay Itliong were instrumental in shaping the direction of farm worker movement in the 1950s.

  On September 8, 1965, Larry Itliong and other Filipino leaders led the predominantly Filipino Agricultural Workers Organizing Committee (AWOC) in a "walk off" from table grape farms, now known as the Delano grape strike. The strikers' goal was to improve farm workers' wages and working conditions. The National Farm Workers' Association (NFWA), a largely Hispanic union led by Cesar Chavez, joined the strike within a week. During the strike, the two groups joined forces and formed the United Farm Workers of America (UFW). By 1970, the UFW won a contract with major grape growers across California.

Economy
Major farm employers in Delano include Wonderful Citrus, Columbine Vineyards, Munger Farms, Lucich Farms, and Hronis. Other major employers include Adventist Health Hospital Delano, Walmart, The Home Depot, Sears (distribution only; no retail), Vallarta Supermarkets, Delano Joint Union High School District, Delano Union Elementary School District, and the North Kern-South Tulare Hospital District.

Major employers
According to the city's 2021 Comprehensive Annual Financial Report, the top employers in the city are:

Geography

Climate

Delano's climate is typical of the San Joaquin Valley. It is located within a desert climatic zone with Mediterranean features. The city receives  of rainfall annually, mainly in the winter. The weather is hot and dry during the summer and cool and damp in winter. Frequent winter ground fog known regionally as tule fog can obscure vision.

Demographics

2010
At the 2010 census Delano had a population of 53,041. The racial makeup of Delano was 19,304 (36.4%) White, 4,191 (7.9%) African American, 501 (0.9%) Native American, 6,757 (12.7%) Asian, 30 (0.1%) Pacific Islander, 20,307 (38.3%) from other races, and 1,951 (3.7%) from two or more races. Hispanic or Latino of any race were 37,913 persons (71.5%).

The census reported that 42,144 people (79.5% of the population) lived in households, 178 (0.3%) lived in non-institutionalized group quarters, and 10,719 (20.2%) were institutionalized.

There were 10,260 households, 6,535 (63.7%) had children under the age of 18 living in them, 5,968 (58.2%) were opposite-sex married couples living together, 2,089 (20.4%) had a female householder with no husband present, 894 (8.7%) had a male householder with no wife present. There were 833 (8.1%) unmarried opposite-sex partnerships, and 61 (0.6%) same-sex married couples or partnerships. 990 households (9.6%) were one person and 424 (4.1%) had someone living alone who was 65 or older. The average household size was 4.11. There were 8,951 families (87.2% of households); the average family size was 4.31.

The age distribution was 15,089 people (28.4%) under the age of 18, 7,813 people (14.7%) aged 18 to 24, 17,248 people (32.5%) aged 25 to 44, 9,644 people (18.2%) aged 45 to 64, and 3,247 people (6.1%) who were 65 or older. The median age was 28.5 years. For every 100 females, there were 149.1 males. For every 100 females age 18 and over, there were 172.3 males.

There were 10,713 housing units at an average density of 746.3 per square mile, of the occupied units 5,764 (56.2%) were owner-occupied and 4,496 (43.8%) were rented. The homeowner vacancy rate was 1.6%; the rental vacancy rate was 3.5%. 24,363 people (45.9% of the population) lived in owner-occupied housing units and 17,781 people (33.5%) lived in rental housing units.

2000
At the 2000 census there were 38,824 people in 8,409 households, including 7,248 families, in the city. The population density was 3,842.1 inhabitants per square mile (1,484.2/km). The racial makeup of the city was 26.16% White, 5.45% Black or African American, 0.91% Native American, 15.88% Asian (primarily Filipino), 0.06% Pacific Islander, 47.07% from other races, and 4.47% from two or more races. 68.47% of the population were Hispanic or Latino of any race.
Of the 8,409 households 56.3% had children under the age of 18 living with them, 60.3% were married couples living together, 18.4% had a female householder with no husband present, and 13.8% were non-families. 10.8% of households were one person and 5.4% were one person aged 65 or older. The average household size was 4.02 and the average family size was 4.27.

The age distribution was 32.5% under the age of 18, 12.4% from 18 to 24, 32.7% from 25 to 44, 14.9% from 45 to 64, and 7.5% 65 or older. The median age was 28 years. For every 100 females, there were 129.9 males. For every 100 females age 18 and over, there were 143.1 males.

The median household income was $28,143 and the median family income  was $29,026. Males had a median income of $38,511 versus $21,509 for females. The per capita income for the city was $11,068. About 25.7% of families and 28.2% of the population were below the poverty line, including 35.3% of those under age 18 and 20.7% of those age 65 or over.

Education 
The Delano Union School District operates eight elementary schools and three middle schools. The Delano Joint Union High School District provides three comprehensive high schools, a continuation high school, and an adult education center.

Elementary schools  
 Albany Park Elementary School 
 Del Vista Math and Science Academy 
 Fremont Elementary School 
 Harvest Elementary School 
 Morningside Elementary School 
 Nueva Vista Language Academy 
 Pioneer School 
 Princeton Street Elementary School 
 Terrace Elementary School

Middle schools  
 Almond Tree Middle School
 Cecil Avenue Math and Science Academy 
 La Vina Middle School

High schools  
 Delano High School 
 Cesar E. Chavez High School
 Robert F. Kennedy High School
 Wonderful College Prep Academy 
 Valley High School
Delano Adult School

College 
Bakersfield College, a community college, serves the community of Delano and the rural communities of northern Kern and southern Tulare counties with a satellite campus at the Delano Center, approximately 35 miles north of the main campus in Bakersfield, California.

Transportation

Bus services 
The Delano Area Rapid Transit (DART) provides fixed route bus service on four routes and demand responsive public transportation service (Dial-A- Ride) to the residents of Delano and the immediate county area surrounding the city within the boundaries of State Route 43 to the west, County Line Road to the north, Pond Road to the south, and Kyte Avenue to the east.

Airport 
The Delano Municipal Airport is an uncontrolled airfield with a 5,651 foot runway and light aviation services, and is open to the public. There is no scheduled airline service, but the airport serves a variety of other significant users. Many military, air charter, air ambulance, and other flying services operate from the airport on a regular basis.

Events 
The Cinco De Mayo Fiesta celebrates Mexican culture with live entertainment and a carnival at Memorial Park. This four-day celebrations commemorates Cinco de Mayo.

Delano is home to the Annual Philippine Weekend festival which celebrates Filipino Culture through performing arts and cultural activities. The festival aims to continue the preservation of the art and history of the Philippines. The festival includes a pork adobo cook-off, grand parade, barrio fiesta, basketball tournament, cultural entertainment, live performance, dance and singing contest, and bingo.

September 16 Celebration

Harvest Holidays off with a golf tournament, softball tournament and 10k run. The Grand Marshal and Queen barbecue is held on Saturday after the Kiddie Parade. Furthermore, the city of Delano, in addition to the Delano Union Elementary School District, host the Harvest Holidays Kiddie Parade, which allows the young ones to be the stars for a day as they wave to the crowds down Main Street. The four day event ends with carnival rides, games, food, and music at Memorial Park.

Christmas Parade

Recreation 
The nearby Sequoia National Forest includes a vast number of Giant Sequoia groves, impressive granite monoliths, scenic canyons and meadows. The Tule Elk State Reserve provides protection to the Tule elk which in the past were in danger of extinction. Lake Woollomes is a popular location. The Kern National Wildlife Refuge is nearby. The Shirley Meadows Ski Area, located on Green Horn Mountain provides skiing opportunities. The nearby Kern River and Isabella Lake are popular during the summer.

Community parks 
The city of Delano has twelve parks for families and children to enjoy.
 Albany Park
 Cecil Park
 Cesar Chavez Park
 Delano Soccer Park
 Delano Skate Park
 Jefferson Park
 Kalibo Park
 Morningside Park
 Martin Luther King Jr. Park 
 Veneto Park
 Heritage Park
 Memorial Park

Notable people 
 Cesar Chavez, activist
 Thomas Guerra, a nephew of Cesar Chavez who became the first person in the state of California to be convicted for intentionally infecting another individual with HIV
 Larry Itliong, activist
 Harold H. Kelley, UCLA Professor of Psychology
 Leamon King, Olympic runner
 Dack Rambo, actor
 Lon Spurrier, Olympic runner
 Luis Valdez, film director, known for La Bamba
 Benita Valente, classical singer (soprano)
 Racella, singer and songwriter

Sister cities 
Delano has four sister cities, as designated by Sister Cities International:
  Arida, Japan
  Asti, Italy
  Jacona, Michoacan, Mexico
  Kalibo, Philippines

See also

References

External links
 
 
 

Cities in Kern County, California
Delano family
Incorporated cities and towns in California
Populated places established in 1873
1873 establishments in California